were first-level administrative divisions of Japan from the 600s to 1868.

Provinces were established in Japan in the late 7th century under the Ritsuryō law system that formed the first central government. Each province was divided into  and grouped into one of the geographic regions or circuits known as the Gokishichidō (Five Home Provinces and Seven Circuits). Provincial borders often changed until the end of the Nara period (710 to 794), but remained unchanged from the Heian period (794 to 1185) until the Edo period (1603 to 1868). The provinces coexisted with the han (domain) system, the personal estates of feudal lords and warriors, and became secondary to the domains in the late Muromachi period (1336 to 1573). 

The Provinces of Japan were replaced with the current prefecture system in the Fuhanken sanchisei during the Meiji Restoration from 1868 to 1871, except for Hokkaido, which was divided into provinces from 1869 to 1882. No order has ever been issued explicitly abolishing the provinces, but they are considered obsolete as administrative units. The provinces are still used in general conversation, especially in navigation and transportation, and referenced in products and geographical features of the prefectures covering their former territories.

History

The provinces were originally established by the Ritsuryō reforms as both administrative units and geographic regions. From the late Muromachi period,  however, they were gradually supplanted by the domains of the sengoku daimyō. Under the rule of Toyotomi Hideyoshi during Azuchi–Momoyama period, the provinces were supplemented as primary local administrative units. The local daimyōs fiefs were developed.

Edo period
In the Edo period, the fiefs became known as han. Imperial provinces and shogunal domains made up complementary systems.  For example, when the shōgun ordered a daimyō to make a census or to make maps, the work was organized in terms of the boundaries of the provincial kuni.

Meiji period
At the Meiji Restoration, the han were legitimized as administrative units by the reform known as the Fuhanken Sanchisei, but they were gradually replaced by prefectures between 1868 and 1871 (urban prefectures were called fu and rural prefectures ken). Provinces as part of the system of addresses were not abolished but, on the contrary, augmented. As of 1871, the number of prefectures was 304, while the number of provinces was 68, not including Hokkaidō or the Ryūkyū Islands. The boundaries between the many prefectures were not only very complicated, but also did not match those of the provinces. Prefectures were gradually merged to reduce the number to 37 by 1881; a few were then divided to give a total of 45 by 1885. Adding Hokkaidō and Okinawa produced the current total of 47 prefectures.

Provinces are classified into Kinai (in or near the capital, then Kyoto) and seven or eight dō (routes, or circuits), collectively known as the Gokishichidō. However, dō in this context should not be confused with modern traffic lines such as the Tōkaidō from Tokyo to Kyoto or Kobe. Also, Hokkaidō in this context should not be confused with Hokkaidō Prefecture, although these two overlap geographically.

Today

No order has ever been issued explicitly abolishing the provinces, but they are considered obsolete. Nevertheless, their names are still widely used in names of natural features, company names, and brands. These province names are considered to be mainly of historical interest. They are also used for the names of items, including family names, most of which were popularized in or after the Edo period. Examples include sanuki udon, iyokan, tosa ken, Chikuzenni, and awa odori. Japan Rail and other railway stations also use them in names to distinguish themselves from similarly named stations in other prefectures, such as Musashi-Kosugi Station. The same is true for some city names, for example to distinguish Yamato-Koriyama, Nara from Koriyama, Fukushima. Simplified names of provinces (-shū) are also used, such as Shinshū soba and Kishū dog.

Some of the province names are used to indicate distinct parts of the current prefectures along with their cultural and geographical characteristics.  In many cases these names are also in use with directional characters, e.g.  meaning   area.

The districts are still considered prefectural subdivisions, but following mergers or divisions of the provinces they may be shared among several prefectures (such as the original Adachi District of Musashi, which is now divided between Adachi Ward in Tokyo and Kita-Adachi District in Saitama). Many of these old provincial districts have been dissolved as their chief towns have been merged into larger cities or towns. See individual prefecture pages for mergers and abolitions of districts.

Provinces located within Hokkaidō are listed last.



c. 716 – c. 738

Although occupied by Kawachi Province in 740, in 757 the province divided again from Kawachi Province.



– separated from Ise Province in 680

 – separated from Ise Province at the beginning of the 8th century

 – separated from Suruga Province in 680

 – Transferred from Tōsandō to Tōkaidō in 771
 – Divided from Kazusa Province in 718. Although re-joined to Kazusa Province in 741, separated from Kazusa Province again in 781
 – divided from Fusa Province in the 7th century

from 721 to 731

 – divided from  during the 4th century
 – divided from Keno Province during the 4th century
 – broke Dewa District in Echigo Province and create Dewa Province in 712. On October of the same year, Mogami and Okitama Districts in Mutsu Province merged into Dewa Province.
Since the 1868 breakup

 – split off from Hitachi Province in the 7th century
718 for several years

Since the 1868 breakup

– broke off from  during the end of the 7th century
 – divided from Echizen Province in 823
 – divided from Echizen Province in 718. Although occupied by Etchu Province in 741, divided from Etchū Province in 757
 – broke off from Koshi Province during the end of the 7th century
 – broke off from Koshi Province during the end of the 7th century
 – although occupied by Echigo in 743, divided from Echigo in 752

– divided from Tanba in 713

– divided from Bizen Province in 713
 – broke off from  during the 2nd half of the 7th century
 – broke off from Kibi Province during the 2nd half of the 7th century
 – broke off from Kibi Province during the 2nd half of the 7th century

Equivalent to Shikoku and its surroundings, as well as a nearby area of Honshu

Equivalent to Kyushu and its surroundings

 – broke off from Toyo Province at the end of the 7th century
 – broke off from  until the end of the 7th century
 – broke off from Tsukushi Province until the end of the 7th century
 – broke off from  until the end of the 7th century
 – broke off from Hi Province until the end of the 7th century
 – earlier called 
 – divided from Hyūga Province in 713
From 702 to 824

 – divided from Hyūga Province in 702
 – officially 
 – officially



Equivalent to Hokkaido and its surroundings. Originally known as the Ezo Region, before being renamed and organized as 11 provinces (1869–1882).

Gallery

See also
 Code of Taihō
 Magiri
 Kokushi (officials)
 Demographics of Japan before Meiji Restoration
 Ritsuryō
 Han (administrative division)
 Samurai

Notes

References
 Nussbaum, Louis-Frédéric and Käthe Roth. (2005).  Japan encyclopedia. Cambridge: Harvard University Press. ;  OCLC 58053128

External links

Detailed maps of the provinces at different times can be found at:
 maproom.org 
 samurai archives
 古事記における旧国名・国境 (律令制以前)
 五畿八道